Lingojiguda is a residential neighbourhood of Hyderabad in Ranga Reddy district, Telangana, India.

References

Neighbourhoods in Hyderabad, India
Villages in Ranga Reddy district